Anna Nasilyan (born 6 September 1980 in Vanadzor, Armenian SSR) is an Armenian middle distance runner. She competed at the 2000 Summer Olympics in the women's 800 metres. Nasilyan's best 800 meter timing is 2:10.83, achieved in 1999.

References

External links
 Sports-Reference.com

1980 births
Living people
People from Vanadzor
Armenian female middle-distance runners
Olympic athletes of Armenia
Athletes (track and field) at the 2000 Summer Olympics